Domeikava is a village in the Kaunas district municipality, located  north of Kaunas city municipality. Area surrounding Domeikava has some of Lithuania's most fertile and productive soil.

Domeikavos Gimnazija, established in early 1920s is the primary high school in the local area with students coming from all nearby villages. Another school, Kauno šv. Kazimiero progimnazija (primary and middle-school) is just outside Domeikava village borders.

According to the 2011 census, the village had a population of 5,006 people. By 2017, Domeikava eldership reached a population of 8820, the increase largely driven by construction of new houses and apartments which attract inhabitants from other areas.

References

Villages in Kaunas County